Oleg Vladimirovitch Polunin (November 1914 – July 1985) was an English botanist, teacher and traveller. He was one of three sons to the artists Vladimir (born in the Russian Empire) and Elizabeth Polunin.  All three sons were interested in the natural sciences: Nicholas Polunin (1909–1997) was an arctic explorer and environmentalist, and Ivan Polunin (1920–2010) was a medical doctor, photographer and ethnographist.

Educated at Magdalen College, Oxford in biology faculty, Oleg Polunin taught at Charterhouse School in Godalming, Surrey, for over 30 years, later devoting his time to writing popular and authoritative guides to the flora of Europe and the Himalaya. His most well-known work is Flowers of Europe (1969), a classic text for both botanists and general readers. Polunin travelled widely in pursuit of samples and photographs, and he discovered several new species.
He was awarded the Linnean Society’s H. H. Bloomer Award in 1983.

Selected books
 Flowers of the Mediterranean (Chatto & Windus, 1967)
 Flowers of Europe: a field guide (Oxford University Press, 1969)
 A Concise Flowers of Europe (Oxford University Press, 1972)
 Flowers of South West Europe (Oxford University Press, 1973)
 Trees and Bushes of Europe (Oxford University Press, 1976)
 Flowers of Greece and the Balkans (Oxford University Press, 1980)
 Flowers of the Himalaya (Oxford University Press, 1985)
 A Guide to the Vegetation of Britain and Europe (Oxford University Press, 1985)
 Concise Flowers of the Himalaya (Oxford University Press, 1987)
 Collins Photoguide to Wild Flowers of Britain and Northern Europe (Collins, 1988)

References

1914 births
1985 deaths
20th-century British botanists
English people of Russian descent
Alumni of Magdalen College, Oxford
English schoolteachers